Myrviken is a locality situated in Berg Municipality, Jämtland County, Sweden with 239 inhabitants in 2010.

References 

Populated places in Berg Municipality
Jämtland